Garry Battle (born September 17, 1985) is a former professional Arena football offensive and defensive lineman.

Early years
Battle attended South View High School in Hope Mills, North Carolina. Where he lettered in basketball and football for two years. In his senior football season he was named to the All-Conference (4AA Two-Rivers) first team.

College career
In 2003 Battle began his college career at Fayetteville State University in Fayetteville, North Carolina.  Battle played several positions including Offensive Lineman, Defensive Lineman, and Tight End. In his 2006 season he was named pre-season All-American.  During his 2007 season he received All-Conference honors (CIAA) and the prestigious Honor as a HBCU All-American.  Battle served as captain for the 2007 season.  Battle also participated in the All-American Heritage Bowl in Southern California, which hosted the nation's top HBCU senior football players.  Battle graduated in 2008 with a bachelor's degree in criminal justice.

Professional career

Fayetteville Guard
Battle played two seasons for the Fayetteville Guard of the American Indoor Football Association (AIFA) in Fayetteville, North Carolina.  He played on the Offensive Line.

Dallas Vigilantes
On February 5, 2010, Battle signed with the Dallas Vigilantes of the Arena Football League (AFL). He played on the Offensive and Defensive Line. He was placed on reassignment on June 4, 2010.

Tulsa Talons
Battle is currently assigned to the Tulsa Talons of the Arena Football League.

References

External links
 https://web.archive.org/web/20110711045604/https://www.fsubroncos.com/sports/m-footbl/mtt/battle_garry00.html
 http://www.dallasvigilantes.com/pressreleases/10-0330-finalroster.html
 http://fayobserver.com/Articles/2010/03/21/984956
 https://web.archive.org/web/20110711045713/https://www.fsubroncos.com/sports/m-footbl/spec-rel/110607aae.html
 http://www.theciaa.com/sports/fball/2007-08/reports/week1-pow0827
 https://web.archive.org/web/20070516044954/http://www.ucwv.edu/athletics/sports/football_news/72406.aspx
 http://blogs.fayobserver.com/fsu-player-heading-to-american-heritage-bowl/
 http://www.ncprepsports.net/SVAthWeb/BBRBRosters.htm
 http://www.ncprepsports.net/SVAthWeb/FBRBMVPAllConf.htm
 http://www.ncprepsports.net/fbTRallconfteam02.htm
 https://www.youtube.com/watch?v=nePkmUoKwh4
 http://www.fayobserver.com/articles/2010/06/17/1006482?sac=Sports

1985 births
Living people
American football defensive linemen
American football offensive linemen
Fayetteville State Broncos football players
Dallas Vigilantes players
Tulsa Talons players
Sportspeople from Fayetteville, North Carolina